First Family Entertainment was an entertainment group specialising in pantomime and other family theatre entertainment, formed in January 2005 as a joint venture between the producers David Ian for Live Nation and Howard Panter for the Ambassador Theatre Group.

First Family Entertainment was taken over by Qdos Entertainment from the 2017/18 season.

Productions

2010/2011 Productions
12 Productions are now planned for the 2010/2011 season.

The planned production of Sleeping Beauty at the Sunderland Empire was cancelled. Replaced with the musical 'White Christmas, running from 19 November 2010 until 1 January 2011.

 Aylesbury Waterside - Cinderella (10-Dec-10 to 9-Jan-11)
 Theatre Royal, Brighton - Cinderella (17-Dec-10 to 9-Jan-11)
 Bristol Hippodrome - Dick Whittington (11-Dec-10 to 2-Jan-11) with Barbara Windsor, Eric Potts & Andy Ford
 Churchill Theatre, Bromley - Aladdin (3-Dec-10 to 9-Jan-11)
 King's Theatre, Glasgow - Snow White (3-Dec-10 to 9-Jan-11)
 Liverpool Empire Theatre - Aladdin (10-Dec-10 to 2-Jan-11) with Les Dennis
 Manchester Opera House - Snow White (3-Dec-10 to 2-Jan-11)
 Milton Keynes Theatre - Jack and the Beanstalk (10-Dec-10 to 16-Jan-11)
 Richmond Theatre - Sleeping Beauty (10-Dec-10 to 16-Jan-11)
 Regent Theatre, Stoke-on-Trent - Robinson Crusoe (9-Dec-10 to 9-Jan-11)
 New Wimbledon Theatre - Peter Pan (17-Dec-10 to 16-Jan-11)
 New Victoria Theatre, Woking - Snow White (11-Dec-10 to 16-Jan-11)

2009/2010 Productions

12 Productions were staged for the 2009/2010 season.

 Theatre Royal, Brighton - Peter Pan (4-Dec-09 to 3-Jan-10)
 Bristol Hippodrome - Snow White (11-Dec-09 to 10-Jan-10)
 Churchill Theatre, Bromley - Sleeping Beauty (4-Dec-09 to 17-Jan-10)
 King's Theatre, Glasgow - Aladdin (04-Dec-09 to 17-Jan-10)
 Liverpool Empire Theatre - Peter Pan (10-Dec-09 to 3-Jan-10)
 Manchester Opera House - Aladdin (5-Dec-09 to 3-Jan-10)
 Milton Keynes Theatre - Cinderella (4-Dec-09 to 17-Jan-10)
 Richmond Theatre - Snow White (4-Dec-09 to 10-Jan-10)
 Regent Theatre, Stoke-on-Trent - Dick Whittington (10-Dec-09 to 10-Jan-10)
 Sunderland Empire - Peter Pan (12-Dec-09 to 10-Jan-10)
 New Wimbledon Theatre - Aladdin (4-Dec-09 to 17-Jan-10)
 New Victoria Theatre, Woking - Cinderella (4-Dec-09 to 10-Jan-10)

2008/2009 Productions

12 Productions were produced for the 2008/2009 season with the addition of the Hippodrome, Bristol and the Empire, Liverpool to the list of venues.

 Theatre Royal, Brighton - The Wizard of Oz (5-Dec-08 to 4-Jan-09)
 Bristol Hippodrome - Cinderella (12-Dec-08 to 11-Jan-09)
 Churchill Theatre, Bromley - Cinderella (5-Dec-08 to 18-Jan-09)
 King's Theatre, Glasgow - Cinderella (28-Nov-08 to 11-Jan-09)
 Liverpool Empire Theatre - Cinderella (11-Dec-08 to 4-Jan-09)
 Manchester Opera House - Peter Pan (6-Dec-08 to 4-Jan-09)
 Milton Keynes Theatre - Peter Pan (5-Dec-08 to 18-Jan-09)
 Richmond Theatre - Peter Pan (5-Dec-08 to 11-Jan-09)
 Regent Theatre, Stoke-on-Trent - Snow White (11-Dec-08 to 11-Jan-09)
 Sunderland Empire - Aladdin (5-Dec-08 to 4-Jan-09)
 New Wimbledon Theatre - Cinderella (5-Dec-08 to 18-Jan-09)
 New Victoria Theatre, Woking - Aladdin (5-Dec-08 to 18-Jan-09)

2007/2008 Productions
10 productions were staged for the 2007/2008 season with the addition of the Sunderland Empire, owned by Live Nation.

Theatre Royal, Brighton - Cinderella (7-Dec-07 to 6-Jan-08)
Churchill Theatre, Bromley - Peter Pan (30-Nov-07 to 13-Jan-08)
Kings Theatre, Glasgow - Sleeping Beauty (30-Nov-07 to 12-Jan-08)
Manchester Opera House - Cinderella (8-Dec-07 to 6-Jan-08)
Milton Keynes Theatre - Aladdin (7-Dec-07 to 20-Jan-08)
Richmond Theatre - Cinderella (7-Dec-07 to 20-Jan-08)
Regent Theatre, Stoke-on-Trent - Cinderella (13-Dec-07 to 13-Jan-08)
Sunderland Empire Theatre -  Cinderella (8-Dec-07 to 6-Jan-08)
New Wimbledon Theatre - Snow White and the Seven Dwarfs (7-Dec-07 to 20-Jan-08)
New Victoria Theatre, Woking - Peter Pan (7-Dec-07 to 13-Jan-08)

2006/2007 Productions

9 productions were staged for the 2006/2007 with the addition of the Manchester Opera House as a venue. Pantomimes at the Opera House have previously been produced by Effective Productions and more recently Qdos Entertainment.

Theatre Royal, Brighton - Aladdin (14-Dec-06 to 14-Jan-07)
Churchill Theatre, Bromley - Mother Goose (1-Dec-06 to 14-Jan-07)
Kings Theatre, Glasgow - Aladdin (1-Dec-06 to 13-Jan-07) 
Manchester Opera House - Snow White and the Seven Dwarfs (9-Dec-06 to 7-Jan-07)
Milton Keynes Theatre - Cinderella (7-Dec-06 to 21-Jan-07)
Richmond Theatre - Jack and the Beanstalk (8-Dec-06 to 20-Jan-07)
Regent Theatre, Stoke-on-Trent - Aladdin (21-Dec-06 to 14-Jan-07)
New Wimbledon Theatre - Peter Pan (7-Dec-06 to 14-Jan-07)
New Victoria Theatre, Woking - Cinderella (7-Dec-06 to 21-Jan-07)

References

Theatre companies in the United Kingdom